Madeline Schizas (born February 14, 2003) is a Canadian figure skater. She is the 2022 CS Golden Spin of Zagreb bronze medalist, the 2020 International Challenge Cup bronze medalist, and a two-time Canadian national champion (2022, 2023), and represented Canada at the 2022 Winter Olympics.

Personal life 
Schizas was born on February 14, 2003, in Oakville, Ontario. She is the daughter of economist Linda Nazareth, and former broadcaster Lou Schizas. Her mother is of Indian Canadian ancestry while her father is Greek Canadian.

Schizas attended White Oaks Secondary School in Oakville. She was accepted to study music cognition at the University of Waterloo beginning in the fall of 2021 and stated her long-term aim was to become a physician. She subsequently transferred to McMaster University, studying in the Department of Psychology, Neuroscience, and Behaviour.

Career

Early years 
Schizas began learning to skate in 2006. As a child, she attended the 2010 Winter Olympics skating competitions in Vancouver, and in later years would cite witnessing bronze medallist Joannie Rochette's famous short program as "an inspiring moment, and it’s one I will never forget." She placed sixth skating in the novice ranks at the 2018 Canadian Championships and won silver as a junior at the 2019 Canadian Championships.

In 2019, she served as a skating double during the filming of the Netflix drama Spinning Out.

2019–2020 season: National bronze 
Making her junior international debut, Schizas placed fifth at the Volvo Open Cup in November 2019 in Riga, Latvia. She then won gold in the senior women's category at the Skate Canada Challenge, qualifying her to compete as a senior at the 2020 Canadian Championships.  At the Championships in January, she placed second in the short program despite performing only a double toe loop as the second part of her planned jump combination.  She was third in the free skate after making several jump errors, including four singled attempts at a double Axel, and as a result, won the bronze medal, finishing 7.47 points behind the champion, Emily Bausback, and 0.87 behind silver medallist Alison Schumacher.  Schizas remarked afterward, "the four single Axels, I don't even know what I was thinking, and the fourth one was an invalid combo, so there were some mental mistakes, but I think it comes along with experience, which you cannot buy."

In February, Schizas won gold in Group II junior ladies at the Bavarian Open. Her senior international debut came later that month at the International Challenge Cup in The Hague, Netherlands. Ranked sixth in the short and third in the free, she finished third overall behind Japan's Rika Kihira and Yuhana Yokoi and was awarded the bronze medal. Her score, 175.56, was the highest score by any Canadian lady that season, though it did not count toward the official ISU Season Best Scores. She was also the only Canadian lady to medal at any senior event that season. Despite this fact, she was passed up for the 2020 World Championships and the 2020 Junior Worlds in favour of more experienced competitors.

2020–2021 season: Worlds debut 
Schizas was named to the Canadian national team by virtue of being the reigning national bronze medallist. She was assigned to make her Grand Prix debut at the 2020 Skate Canada International, but the event was cancelled as a result of the coronavirus pandemic.  Schizas planned to introduce the triple Lutz jump into her programs for the new season, having worked on it for a few years previously without sufficient results.  Repeating her short program from the previous season, she selected the music from The Umbrellas of Cherbourg for a new free skate, in tribute to ice dancers Tessa Virtue and Scott Moir, who had performed to it in the 2007–08 season.

With the pandemic continuing to affect competitions, Schizas first won the Ontario Sectional Championships, held virtually.  The 2021 Skate Canada Challenge was also organized virtually, filmed in November and December and then judged in January.  She placed fourth in the short program, executing only a double toe loop as part of her combination and making a serious error on her triple loop.  She won the free skate decisively, landing six of seven planned triple jumps, including a triple Lutz-triple toe loop combination for the first time.  She won her second consecutive gold medal at Challenge.  This would have qualified her to the 2021 Canadian Championships, but they were cancelled as a result of the pandemic, making it impossible to hold an in-person contest. Skating journalist Beverley Smith remarked, "we can't technically call Madeline Schizas a Canadian champion", "but effectively, she is."

On February 25, Schizas was announced as one of the two ladies' entries' to the 2021 World Championships in Stockholm, along with Emily Bausback, her debut at an ISU championship. She placed thirteenth, including setting a personal best with a ninth-place finish in the short program. Schizas' placement qualified a berth for Canada at the 2022 Winter Olympics in Beijing.

2021–2022 season: Beijing Olympics 
In addition to longtime choreographer Asher Hill, Schizas collaborated on her Madama Butterfly free program with Lance Vipond, the regular choreographer of retired Canadian women's skating star Kaetlyn Osmond. She began the season at the Skating Club of Boston's Cranberry Cup, where she finished in fifth. She was next assigned to make her Challenger debut at the 2021 CS Finlandia Trophy, where she placed ninth, including setting a new personal best in the free skate. Schizas said she was pleased with the free skate, an opportunity to introduce new technical content.

Schizas made her Grand Prix debut at the 2021 Skate Canada International, where she placed ninth in both segments for eighth place overall, with a new personal best in total score. She was the highest-ranked Canadian woman in the event, finishing 26.68 points ahead of the next-ranked Emily Bausback in eleventh. She identified adding speed to her skating as her primary focus for improvement. In the interval between events, she competed domestically, winning the Ontario Sectionals for the third consecutive year. At her second Grand Prix, the 2021 Rostelecom Cup, she placed fourth in the short program with a clean skate. She made two errors in the free skate, stepping out of her triple flip and then doubling a planned triple Salchow, but still finished sixth overall, the highest Grand Prix placement for a Canadian woman in four years. Schizas noted that Rostelecom was "the biggest audience I've ever skated to. I think it was a great experience for hopefully the Olympics and World Championships."

Not having finished behind another Canadian woman in competition in almost two years, Schizas entered the 2022 Canadian Championships as the favourite for the title. Skating cleanly in the short program, she won that segment by 12.70 points. Despite some jump errors, she easily won the free skate as well, taking the gold medal and becoming the presumptive nominee for the Canadian Olympic team. Speaking afterward, she said that looking ahead to Beijing, "my biggest goal is to avoid catching COVID" in the weeks remaining before departure. On January 9, she was named to the Olympic team.

As the lone Canadian women's singles skater, Schizas began the 2022 Winter Olympics as her country's entry in the women's segments of the Olympic team event. With the women skating last among the short program segments, due to the underperformance of Canada's entries in the first three, especially that of Roman Sadovsky, Schizas was under significant pressure to perform and elevate Canada into the top five to qualify for the free skate. Delivering a clean short program and a new personal best score, she unexpectedly ranked third and took Canada from sixth place to fourth overall. Schizas said she was "a little bit nervous before today about being a part of the team and skating individually, but they gave me so much support, and I just loved the experience." Skating the free segment, she again placed third with a new personal best, the only error being a doubled attempt at a triple Lutz. Schizas' performances were widely cited as the highlight of the event for Team Canada, which finished in fourth place. However, the results of the team event were soon after thrown into doubt after a positive doping test for Russian skater Kamila Valieva resulted in the medal ceremony being delayed indefinitely. When asked about the possibility of the Canadian team being moved up to third, Schizas noted, "we have not won a medal yet; we're waiting on the outcome of the investigation. So once that happens, we’ll see where the pieces fall."

In the Olympic women's event, Schizas stepped out of the landing of her triple Lutz and, as a result, had to salvage a combination on her triple loop, managing only a double toe loop instead of a triple. She placed twentieth, advancing to the free skate, and calling it "an up-and-down performance." She struggled with her jumps in the free skate, finishing eighteenth and moving up to nineteenth place overall. Schizas attributed her individual event performance to the difficulties of performing four programs in a short span and added that "the most important event here for me was the team event, as Canada had a chance at a medal there. That’s really where my focus was." 

Days after the Olympics concluded, Vladimir Putin ordered an invasion of Ukraine, as a result of which the International Skating Union banned all Russian and Belarusian skaters from competing at the 2022 World Championships. This had a major impact on the women's field, which Russians dominated for most of the preceding eight years. Schizas entered the competition with the stated goal of placing in the top ten to recover a second berth for Canadian women. She placed tenth in the short program and said she was pleased with her performance after an "up and down kind of week" in practice sessions. Tenth in the free skate as well, she finished twelfth overall, with less than half a point separating her from ninth place.

In the off-season, Schizas was a guest participant in the Stars on Ice Canadian tour for the first time.

2022–2023 season
Beginning the season at the 2022 CS Nebelhorn Trophy, Schizas placed second in the short program but dropped to fifth overall after a tenth-place free skate. She shared the Fritz Geiger Memorial Trophy with the rest of the Canadian delegation, awarded to the top country at the competition. Schizas would later attribute her difficulties at Nebelhorn to heightened expectations from the Olympics.

Schizas' first Grand Prix assignment, the 2022 Skate Canada International, was held in Mississauga, the same location as her breakthrough bronze medal win at the Canadian Championships three seasons earlier. She said it was "weird to think how different of an experience that was." She unexpectedly won the short program, with fellow Canadian skater Gabrielle Daleman placing second. However, the free skate was once again a struggle, with several jump errors that saw her ranked ninth in the segment and dropping to seventh overall. She said afterward, "I knew full well that door was open. I just didn't figure out how to walk through it." Schizas went on to finish fifth at the 2022 Grand Prix of Espoo, her new highest placement on the Grand Prix. Following this, she was sent to the 2022 CS Golden Spin of Zagreb. Fourth in the short program, she rose to third in the free skate and won the bronze medal, her first on the Challenger circuit.

Entering the 2023 Canadian Championships as the favourite to retain her title, Schizas stepped out of her triple loop, but still placed first with score of 68.32, 7.11 points clear of her longtime friend and training mate Lia Pereira in second place. In the free skate she doubled a planned triple flip and had rough landings on a few other jumps in the second half of her program. She placed second in that segment, behind Kaiya Ruiter, but remained first overall and won her second national title. She called the experience "pretty surreal." Her coach, Nancy Lemaire, said that they would continue to look at improving her consistency on the flip jump, which Lemaire said she could do fine in practice. Schizas was named as Canada's lone women's entry to the 2023 World Championships, and also assigned to the 2023 Four Continents Championships.

Schizas finished tenth at the Four Continents Championships.

Skating technique

Unlike most skaters, Schizas spins and jumps clockwise since she is left-handed.

Programs

Competitive highlights 

GP: Grand Prix; CS: Challenger Series; JGP: Junior Grand Prix

Detailed results 
Small medals for short and free programs awarded only at ISU Championships.

Senior results

Junior results

References

See also
 List of University of Waterloo people
 List of people from Oakville, Ontario

External links 
 
 

2003 births
Canadian female single skaters
Canadian people of Greek descent
Canadian people of Indian descent
Canadian sportspeople of Indian descent
Living people
Olympic figure skaters of Canada
Sportspeople from Oakville, Ontario
Figure skaters at the 2022 Winter Olympics